The  is a Japanese transport company in Ōme, Tokyo. It belongs to the Keio Group. The company operates a funicular line and a chairlift, both in Mount Mitake. The company was founded in 1927.

Funicular line

The difference in elevation between the two stations is 424 m (1,390ft). Construction began in 1930, and operation started in 1935. In 1944, it was suspended due to World War II and partially scrapped for material, with operation only starting again in 1951.

In 1991, the gauge was changed from the original 1,067mm to 1,049mm because the rail profile was increased. 

Three generations of vehicles have been used on the route. The original Ko-1 type (コー１系) was replaced with the Ko-2 type (コー２系) in 1968, which was in turn replaced in 2008.

Pasmo and Suica IC cards are accepted as payment methods.

Mitakesan Station
This station is the ground station. It is made up of a single track, two platforms and a kiosk which is located outside of the ticket hall.

Takimoto Station
This station is the ground station. It is made up of a single track, two platforms and a kiosk which is located outside of the ticket hall. A bus stop is located near this station with bus services to Mitake Station operated by Nishi Tokyo Bus which is owned by Keio Group.

Chairlift

The company also operates a chairlift. Its stations are called Mitake Daira (immediately next to the funicular's Mitake station) and Daitenbōdai and it was opened in 1958.

See also
List of funicular railways
List of railway companies in Japan
List of railway lines in Japan

References

External links
 Official website 
 Official website (limited information in English)

Funicular railways in Japan